This is the list of cathedrals in Malaysia sorted by denomination.

Anglican
Cathedrals of the Church of the Province of South East Asia:

Diocese of Kuching
 Cathedral of St Thomas in Kuching

Diocese of Sabah
 Cathedral of All Saints in Kota Kinabalu

Diocese of West Malaysia
 Cathedral of St. Mary the Virgin in Kuala Lumpur

Lutheran

Cathedral of the Evangelical Lutheran Church in Malaysia:
 Cathedral of Zion in Kuala Lumpur

Oriental Orthodox

Cathedral of the Malankara Orthodox Syrian Church in Malaysia
 Cathedral of St. Mary the Theotokos in Kuala Lumpur

Roman Catholic
Cathedrals of the Roman Catholic Church in Malaysia:

Ecclesiastical Province of Kuala Lumpur
 St.John's Cathedral in Kuala Lumpur
 Holy Spirit Cathedral in George Town
 Cathedral of the Sacred Heart of Jesus in Johor Bahru

Ecclesiastical Province of Kota Kinabalu
 Sacred Heart Cathedral in Kota Kinabalu
 St. Mary's Cathedral in Sandakan
 Cathedral of St. Francis Xavier in Keningau

Ecclesiastical Province of Kuching
 St. Joseph's Cathedral in Kuching
 Cathedral of St. Joseph in Miri
 Sacred Heart Cathedral in Sibu

See also

List of cathedrals
Christianity in Malaysia

References

 
Malaysia
Cathedrals
Cathedrals